Susan Elizabeth Birtwistle, Lady Eyre, (born 9 December 1945) is a producer and writer of television drama. Birtwistle has won awards for several of her productions, including Hotel du Lac, Pride and Prejudice and Emma, and was one of the nominees for the 2008 BAFTA Awards for her production of Cranford.

Early life
She was born in Northwich, Cheshire, England, and attended Northwich County Grammar School for Girls (now The County High School, Leftwich). She studied drama and English at Coventry College of Education (became part of the University of Warwick).

Career
She is known for producing well-known costume dramas.

Partial filmography as producer
Oi For England
Educating Marmalade
 Dutch Girls, 1985
 Hotel du Lac, 1986
 Scoop, 1987
 Ball Trap on the Cote Sauvage 1989
 Or Shall We Die?
 v.
 Pride and Prejudice, 1995
 Emma, 1996
 Armadillo
 King Lear
 Wives and Daughters, 1999
 Cranford, 2007
 Return to Cranford, 2009

Personal life
In 2008, she was awarded an honorary doctorate at the University of Chester.

She married the English film, theatre, television and opera director Richard Eyre in 1973 in Chelsea, London; they have one daughter, Lucy (born in 1974).

References

External links
 

1945 births
Living people
Alumni of the University of Warwick
English television producers
English television writers
People from Northwich
British women television writers
British women television producers
Wives of knights